Sir William Arthian Davies (10 May 1901 – 19 September 1979) was a lawyer and judge in England and Wales.

Davies was educated at Dulwich College and Trinity College, Oxford, where he took a First in Jurisprudence. He was called to the bar in 1925 and took silk in 1947.

He was appointed a judge of the High Court and assigned to the Probate, Divorce and Admiralty Division on 1 October 1952, receiving the customary knighthood a few days later. He was transferred to the Queen's Bench Division on 3 April 1959. Davies was promoted to be a Lord Justice of Appeal on 9 January 1961. Following that appointment, he was made a member of the Privy Council of the United Kingdom. He retired from his judicial office on 30 September 1974.

References
 The Judges of England 1272-1990, by Sir John Sainty (Selden Society, 1993)

1901 births
1979 deaths
20th-century English judges
Knights Bachelor
Lords Justices of Appeal
Probate, Divorce and Admiralty Division judges
Queen's Bench Division judges
Members of the Privy Council of the United Kingdom
British King's Counsel